Robert Bethea Scarborough (October 29, 1861November 23, 1927) was a U.S. Representative from South Carolina.

Born in Chesterfield, South Carolina, about a year after the state had declared its secession to join the Confederate States, Scarborough attended the common schools and Mullins (South Carolina) Academy.
He taught school and studied law.
Scarborough was admitted to the bar in 1884 and commenced practice in Conway, South Carolina.
He was a county attorney of Horry County 1885-1893 and served as clerk of the county board 1885-1890.
He served as member of the South Carolina State senate in 1897 and 1898 and was elected president pro tempore in 1898. He served as the 63rd Lieutenant Governor of South Carolina in 1899.

Scarborough was elected as a Democrat to the Fifty-seventh and Fifty-eighth Congresses (March 4, 1901 – March 3, 1905).
He declined to be a candidate for renomination in 1904 to the Fifty-ninth Congress.
He resumed the practice of law in Conway, South Carolina, and was also interested in banking.
He served as chairman of the board of regents of the South Carolina State Hospital.

He died in Conway, South Carolina, on November 23, 1927 and was interred in Lake Side Cemetery.

Sources

1861 births
1927 deaths
Democratic Party South Carolina state senators
Lieutenant Governors of South Carolina
Democratic Party members of the United States House of Representatives from South Carolina
People from Chesterfield, South Carolina
People from Conway, South Carolina
People born in the Confederate States